The Central Command (Pikud Merkaz), often abbreviated to Pakmaz (פקמ"ז), is a regional command of the Israel Defense Forces. It is responsible for the units and brigades located in the West Bank (under the West Bank Division), Jerusalem, the Sharon, Gush Dan, and the Shephelah.

The commander (Aluf) of the central command is the one who is authorized to declare new cities in the Judea and Samaria Area.

History
During the 1948 Arab–Israeli War, the Central Command was in-charge of the war efforts against Jordan, particularly on the road to Jerusalem, occupying the "Small Triangle" (east Sharon), Lod, and Ramla. During the Six-Day War, the Command led the occupation of  the West Bank from Jordan. As of the First Intifada, the Command primarily engages in security and counter-terrorism activities, as well as more conventional military measures, in the West Bank.

Towards the end of 2010 the deployment of IDF troops in and around the West Bank reached a new quantitative low with only half the number of infantry battalions serving where "dozens" were required during the first Intifada.

Units

 Central Command in Neve Yaakov
 98th "Ha-Esh"/"Fire" Paratroopers (Reserve) Division
 340th "Idan" (Reserve) Division
 877th "Judea and Samaria" (Territorial) Division
 417th "Jordan Valley" (Territorial) Infantry Brigade
 41st "Jordan Lions" Unisex Light Infantry Battalion
 47th "Young Lions" Unisex Light Infantry Battalion
 5004th "Central Command" Logistic Support Unit
 Central Command Signal Battalion
 Central Command Engineering Unit
 Central Command Intelligence Unit
 Central Command Military Police Unit
 Central Command Medical Unit
 650th Maintenance Center

Commanders
All commanders of the Central Command were ranked Aluf (Major General).

Zvi Ayalon (1948–1952)
Yosef Avidar (1952–1953)
Zvi Ayalon (1954–1956)
Zvi Zur (1956–1958)
Meir Amit (1958–1959)
Yosef Geva (1960–1966)
Uzi Narkis (1966–1968)
Rehav'am Ze'evi (1968–1972)
Yona Efrat (1973–1977)
Moshe Levi (1977–1981)
Ori Orr (1981–1983)
Amnon Lipkin-Shahak (1983–1986)
Ehud Barak (1986–1987)
Amram Mitzna (1987–1989)
Yitzhak Mordechai (1989–1991)
Danny Yatom (1991–1993)
Nehemiah Tamari (1993–1994) - KIA
Danny Yatom (1994)
Ilan Birn (1994–1995)
Uzi Dayan (1996–1998)
Moshe Ya'alon (1998–2000)
Yitzhak Eitan (2000–2002)
Moshe Kaplinsky (2002–2004)
Yair Nave (2004–2007)
Gadi Shamni (2007–2009)
Avi Mizrahi (2009–2012)
Nitzan Alon (2012–2015)
Roni Numa (2015–2018)
Nadav Padan (2018–2020)
Tamir Yadai (2020–2021)
Yehuda Fuchs (2021–)

References

 
Regional commands of Israel